Stanton Clayborn Pemberton (July 9, 1858– May 25, 1944) was an American politician and businessman.

Biography
Pemberton was born near Oakland, Illinois. He was involved with the lumber and coal business in Oakland, Illinois. He served in the Illinois Senate from 1897 until 1913/ Pemberton was a Republican. He died at the Paris Hospital in Paris, Illinois after suffering a stroke. The Pemberton Hall at Eastern Illinois University in Charleston, Illinois was named after Pemberton who was able to get the appropriation approved for the resident hall.

Notes

External links

1858 births
1944 deaths
People from Oakland, Illinois
Businesspeople from Illinois
Republican Party Illinois state senators
Eastern Illinois University people